Jana Fernández Velasco (born 18 February 2002) is a Spanish professional footballer who plays as a centre back for Liga F club FC Barcelona and captains the Spain women's national under-20 team.

Club career
Fernández was born in Martorell in the town of Baix Llobregat in the Province of Barcelona. She began her football training at FC Barcelona's La Masia in 2014 at 12 years old.

Fernández made her debut for Barcelona in November 2018 at 16 years and 9 months, while she was still playing with the club's Juvenil-Cadet section. She was the club's second-youngest debutant after FC Barcelona Femení's professionalization in 2015.

In the summer of 2020, Fernández signed her first full-team contract for three seasons.

On 10 March 2021, she made her first start in the UEFA Women's Champions League in a 5–0 win against Danish side Fortuna Hjørring. Barcelona went on to win the Champions League that year for the first time in their history. Fernández made 16 league appearances in her first senior season, a competition that Barcelona also won. On 27 May 2021, Fernández made her first appearance in the Copa de la Reina in a 4–0 win against Madrid CFF. Barcelona won the 2021 Copa de la Reina on 30 May and completed the continental treble.

Fernández scored her first goal with Barcelona in 2021 in a 9–1 win against Deportivo Alavés. On 14 February 2022, the club announced that Fernández had torn the cruciate ligament of her right knee and would be out for the rest of the 2021–22 season. She finished her season with 18 total appearances and 2 goals.

International career
Fernández has played with all official categories of Spanish youth national teams, including their U17s, U19s, and U20s.

She was a part of Spain's U-17 national team that won the 2018 UEFA Women's Under-17 Championship. By winning the UEFA Women's U-17 Championship, Spain automatically qualified for the 2018 FIFA U-17 Women's World Cup. Fernandez played every match for the Spanish side that won the tournament, the first World Cup won by Spanish women in any age category.

Career statistics

Honours
Barcelona
UEFA Women's Champions League: 2020–21
Primera División: 2020–21, 2021–22
Copa de la Reina: 2020–21
Supercopa de España Femenina: 2021–22

Spain U17
UEFA Women's Under-17 Championship: 2018
FIFA U-17 Women's World Cup: 2018

References

External links
 Jana Fernández at La Liga
 Jana Fernández at FC Barcelona
 Jana Fernández at FC Barcelona players
 Jana Fernández at BDFutbol
 
 
 
 Jana Fernández at Txapeldunak 

2002 births
Living people
FC Barcelona Femení players
Sportswomen from Catalonia
Spanish women's footballers
Footballers from Catalonia
Women's association football fullbacks
Women's association football defenders
Primera División (women) players
FC Barcelona Femení B players
Segunda Federación (women) players
Spain women's youth international footballers
21st-century Spanish women